Gulden's is the third largest American manufacturer of mustard, after French's and Grey Poupon.  One of the oldest continuously operating mustard brands in the United States, it is now owned by agricultural giant ConAgra Foods.

Gulden's is known for its spicy brown mustard, which includes a blend of mustard seeds and spices. The Gulden's mustard recipe has remained a secret for more than 140 years.

History 
Charles Gulden was born on September 23, 1843, in New York City. By the age of 15, he was employed as an engraver. Two years later, he went to work for his uncle, who owned the Union Mustard Mills. After serving with a reserve regiment at Gettysburg during the Civil War, he returned briefly to his uncle's shop.

Gulden opened his own mustard company in 1862. He chose Elizabeth Street  for his shop, near the South Street shipping berths, where he could easily obtain the mustard seeds and spices necessary to mix with vintage vinegars. 

By 1883, Gulden's product line included 30 mustard varieties and other products, including olives, capers, cottonseed oil, ketchup, and Worcestershire sauce. That year, he expanded down the street into a six-story building.

Drawing from his earlier experience as an engraver, Charles Gulden once asked his brother: "Do you think it would help if we were to attach a spoon to each bottle of No. 6, no extra charge?" Soon, the Guldens were attaching fine, imported spoons to each bottle.

Gulden's mustard won awards in 1869 and 1883. It also earned awards at the World's Columbian Exposition, Chicago 1893, the Exposition Universelle, Paris 1900, the Sesquicentennial International Exposition in Philadelphia in 1926, and the Napa Valley Mustard Festival in 2005. However, the Gulden's mustard sold today is not the same formula as the mustard that won the awards in the late nineteenth and early twentieth century. As recently as the 1960s, when the company was headquartered in Saddle Brook, New Jersey, the ingredients listed on the label were: "Mustard seed, vinegar, spices, and salt." Turmeric was not listed, as it is today.

Charles Gulden died in 1916 and is buried at Woodlawn Cemetery in the Bronx, New York. Gulden's was sold to American Home Foods (a division of American Home Products), which was spun off and renamed International Home Foods in 1996. In 2000, ConAgra purchased International Home Foods.

Gulden's mustard is now made in Milton, Pennsylvania.

See also 

 List of mustard brands

References

Sources 
Hallett, Anthony and Diane Hallett, 1997, Encyclopedia of Entrepreneurs, Entrepreneur Magazine, pp 238–239.

External links 

 Official website

Brand name condiments
Mustard brands
1862 introductions
Conagra Brands brands
1862 establishments in New York (state)